Festo may refer to:

FESTO (Esperanto meeting), a yearly French Esperanto meeting organized by Espéranto-Jeunes
Festo, German automation company
 Festo, Porcio Festo, was the Roman procurator of Iudaea Province, in succession to Antonius Felix
 Festo Corp. v. Shoketsu Kinzoku Kogyo Kabushiki Co., a landmark patent-law case